Suhum, Ghana is a peri-urban town and the capital of the Suhum Municipal District, a district in the Eastern Region Ghana. Suhum has a 2021 settlement population of 126,403. The town lies along the Accra-Kumasi Highway.

See also
 Suhum/Kraboa/Coaltar district

References

External links
 MSN Map

Populated places in the Eastern Region (Ghana)